Ludwig Schwarz, S.D.B. (born 4 June 1940) is the Catholic bishop of the Diocese of Linz, Austria.

Life
Ludwig Schwarz was the first of nine children and grew up in Most pri Bratislave. After the expulsion of his family from Slovakia in 1945, he arrived in Vienna, where he attended primary school. He attended a Gymnasium in Vienna for a time, but switched to the Salesian school in Ebreichsdorf-Unterwaltersdorf  at the age of fourteen. In June 1959, he sat for the Matura exams and subsequently joined the order of the Salesians of Don Bosco. He was assigned a two-year teaching practicum; for the first year he served as a general assistant in Ebreichsdorf, and the second at the Schülerheim Vinzentinum in Klagenfurt.

He studied philosophy in Ebreichsdorf and Catholic theology in Klagenfurt; from 1961 to 1964 he studied at Benediktbeuern Theological College (Philosophisch-Theologischen Hochschule Benediktbeuern). On 29 June 1964, he was ordained to the priesthood by the Bishop of Augsburg, . He afterwards served briefly as assistant chaplain at a parish church in Graz. He then studied classical philology and archeology at the University of Vienna, and was also the hospital chaplain at Sacred Heart Hospital (Herz Jesu Krankenhaus Wien). He received his doctorate in 1970. From 1969 to 1978, he was rector of an inter-diocesan seminary, Canisiusheim Centrum Horn. Until 1984, he was superior of the Austrian province of the Salesians, situated in Vienna.

In 1984 he was appointed to a directorship at the Salesian Pontifical University in Rome. Starting in 1985, he taught Christian classical philology at the university. In 1993, he assumed the responsibilities of provincial for the Roman Province of the Salesians of Don Bosco.

From February 1999 to February 2005, he was National Director of Pontifical Mission Societies in Austria (popularly known as Missio). On 15 October 2001, Pope John Paul II appointed him an auxiliary bishop for the Archdiocese of Vienna with the titular see of Simidicca. Schwarz received episcopal ordination on 25 November 2001 by Cardinal Christoph Schönborn at St. Stephen's Cathedral in Vienna. In that capacity, he directed Vienna's Diocesan Office for Mission and Development.

As bishop of Linz
Schwarz was appointed the Diocesan Bishop of Linz on 6 July 2005 by Pope Benedict XVI; he assumed that office on 18 September.

Schwarz put an end to some of the liberal practices of his predecessor, Maximilian Aichern. Unlike his predecessor, Schwarz is typically unwilling to grant exemptions from ecclesiastical norms. He has enforced Catholic teaching that prohibits baptisms and preaching by lay people, and has been more stringent about norms for the reception of the Eucharist.

Schwarz has also had to deal with some controversy over the nomination of Gerhard Maria Wagner as auxiliary bishop of the diocese, who was known for his view that Hurricane Katrina was a punishment for New Orleans' sins. Wagner's selection by the Congregation for Bishops with Schwarz's support was rejected by many of the liberal deans in Austria. Wagner eventually turned down the appointment, after 2 weeks where the number of people leaving the Church quadrupled in his Linz congregation, with similar or even higher numbers in the neighbouring communities, many of the ex-parishioners naming Wagner's appointment as the reason for their departure.

References

External links 
 Curriculum vitae from Diocese of Linz 
 Biography from Archdiocese of Vienna 
 Bishop Ludwig Schwarz, S.D.B. at catholichierarchy.com 

21st-century Roman Catholic bishops in Austria
Bishops of Linz
Salesian bishops
Austrian people of Slovak descent
Austrian people of Hungarian descent
Clergy from Bratislava
1940 births
Living people